Ola S. Apeland (born 14 May 1964) is a Norwegian politician for the Centre Party.

He served as a deputy representative to the Parliament of Norway from Rogaland during the term 1989–1993 and 1993–1997. In total he met during 40 days of parliamentary session.

References

1964 births
Living people
Deputy members of the Storting
Centre Party (Norway) politicians
Rogaland politicians
20th-century Norwegian politicians
Place of birth missing (living people)